Ronald Lloyd Myren (4 June 1937 – 10 Nov 2003) was a Canadian artist and landscape painter. He was a well known artist in Western Canada  (Alberta and British Columbia) who painted mostly in the foothills and mountainous areas of those provinces. He was the Chief Preparator and Registrar, and was in charge of installations at the Edmonton Art Gallery (from 1966 to 1980), now known as the Art Gallery of Alberta (AGA). He was not a religious man in the traditional church sense of the word, and was not baptized. He believed in nature and was often quoted as saying, "Nature is my church." He expressed his belief and feeling about nature through his art. He spent a great deal of time every summer out in the foothills of Alberta painting, taking photos and fishing. He said he was recording scenes of nature that were going to disappear because of logging and development, and in some respects this prediction has come true.

Education  
He was born in Galloway, British Columbia in 1937 and attended the Alberta College of Art in Calgary for two years in the early 1960s. Due to finances he did not graduate but continued a quest in the love of learning about art for his entire life.

Painting  
Over the course of his career he had 11 solo exhibitions and participated in 23 group exhibitions. He has art in numerous public collections   and his work has many private collectors.

Solo exhibitions:

 Downstairs Gallery, Edmonton AB, 1975
 Edmonton Art Gallery, Edmonton AB, 1976 
 Downstairs Gallery, Edmonton AB, 1977
 Downstairs Gallery, Edmonton AB, 1979
 Mira Goddard Gallery, Toronto ON, 1981
 Mira Goddard Gallery, Toronto ON, 1982
 Mira Goddard Gallery, Calgary AB, 1982
 Mira Goddard Gallery, Calgary AB, 1983
 Hett Gallery, Edmonton AB, 1983
 Kathleen Laverty Gallery, Edmonton AB, 1990 
 Bugara Kmet Gallery Edmonton AB, 1994

Group exhibitions:
 Civic Centennial Exhibition, Edmonton AB, 1967
 Alberta 1973, Edmonton Art Gallery, Edmonton AB, 1973
 Summer '74, Edmonton Art Gallery, Edmonton AB, 1974
 Alberta Realists, Edmonton Art Gallery, Edmonton AB, 1974
 Prairie 74, Painters of The Prairies, Saidye Bonfmon Center, Montreal QB, 1974
 Changing Visions Canadian Landscapes Traveling Exhibition, Edmonton Art Gallery & Art Gallery of Ontario, 1976 
 Index 77, 1977
 Ron Myren & Terry Fenton, Canadian Art Galleries, Calgary AB, 1978 
 Alberta Collects Alberta Art, Beaver House, Edmonton AB, 1978
 Art Works from the Alberta Art Foundation to Japan, 1979
 The Alberta Landscape, Edmonton Art Gallery, Edmonton AB, 1979
 Horizons West, Shell Travelling Exhibition, 1979 
 Painting in Alberta an Historical Survey, Edmonton Art Gallery, Edmonton AB. 1980
 Alberta Culture Exhibition, Beaver House, Edmonton AB. 1980
 The Big Picture, Edmonton Art Gallery, Edmonton AB, 1981 
 Fall Opening, Hett Gallery, Edmonton AB, 1983
 Fall Exhibition, Kathleen Laverty Gallery, Edmonton AB, 1986
 Selections from The Edmonton Art Gallery Permanent Collection, McMullen Gallery, University of Alberta, Edmonton AB, 1987
 An Alberta Sense of Place, Selections from the Alberta Arts Foundation at McMullen Gallery, University of Alberta, Edmonton AB, 1987
 Alberta Drawings, Edmonton Art Gallery, Edmonton AB, 1991
 Masterful Drawings, Faculty of Extension, University of Alberta, Edmonton AB, 1993
 The Works Visual Arts Festival, University of Alberta Exhibit, Edmonton AB, 2001
 Work sold at Jasper Park Originals, Jasper Park Lodge AB, 1995–1998
 Out On A Limb, Art Gallery of Alberta, Edmonton AB, Sept. 2011 – Feb. 2012

Public collections 
The following is a list of companies and government agencies that have Ron Myren's art in their collections:
 Alberta Arts Foundation (eight paintings)
 Art Gallery of Alberta (seven paintings)
 University of Alberta  (four paintings)
 Northern Jubilee Auditorium Art Collection (three paintings)
 Alberta Government Art Collections
 Bank of Nova Scotia
 Canada Council Art Bank 
 Canadian Department of External Affairs
 Edmonton Public School Board
 Glenrose Rehabilitation Hospital Edmonton
 Gulf Oil
 Imperial Oil
 Red Deer College
 Richardson Securities
 Seeal-Alcan Ltd.
 Shell Oil
 Trimac Corporation

Teaching 

 Edmonton Art Gallery
 Drawing #1 and #2, 1970–1973
 University of Alberta Extension Dept.
 Painting #1 and #2, Barrhead, AB, 1981–1982
 Landscape Painting, Westlock, AB, 1981–1982
 Pen and Ink Drawing, Camrose, AB, 1981–1982
 Edmonton Art Gallery
 Painting, 1983–1987
 Ottwell Community League, Friends of Ottwell
 Painting, 1987–1989

References

External links
 Search for "Myren" to see several paintings, at Alberta E-museum

Artists from Alberta
Canadian landscape painters
1937 births
2003 deaths